Osyka is a town in Pike County, Mississippi, United States. It is located on the Mississippi–Louisiana state line. The population was 440 at the 2010 census. It is part of the McComb, Mississippi Micropolitan Statistical Area. The peak of its population was in 1910.

History
The community was named after Ossika ("The Eagle"), a Choctaw chieftain.

Geography
Osyka is located at  (31.007196, -90.471165).

Demographics

2020 census

As of the 2020 United States Census, there were 381 people, 154 households, and 102 families residing in the town.

2000 census
As of the census of 2000, there were 481 people, 193 households, and 132 families residing in the town. The population density was 468.1 people per square mile (180.3/km). There were 234 housing units at an average density of 227.7 per square mile (87.7/km). The racial makeup of the town was 53.01% White, 44.91% African American, 0.83% Native American, 0.42% Asian, and 0.83% from two or more races.

There were 193 households, out of which 32.1% had children under the age of 18 living with them, 46.6% were married couples living together, 16.1% had a female householder with no husband present, and 31.6% were non-families. 31.6% of all households were made up of individuals, and 19.2% had someone living alone who was 65 years of age or older. The average household size was 2.49 and the average family size was 3.12.

In the town, the population was spread out, with 28.9% under the age of 18, 8.7% from 18 to 24, 23.9% from 25 to 44, 19.8% from 45 to 64, and 18.7% who were 65 years of age or older. The median age was 35 years. For every 100 females, there were 87.2 males. For every 100 females age 18 and over, there were 81.0 males.

The median income for a household in the town was $17,813, and the median income for a family was $25,078. Males had a median income of $21,750 versus $12,500 for females. The per capita income for the town was $11,550. About 27.1% of families and 29.8% of the population were below the poverty line, including 51.6% of those under age 18 and 25.8% of those age 65 or over.

Education
The Town of Osyka is served by the South Pike School District

See also
Kirkville, Louisiana

References

External links
 "History of Osyka's Jewish community", Institute of Southern Jewish Life

Towns in Pike County, Mississippi
Towns in Mississippi
Towns in McComb micropolitan area
Mississippi placenames of Native American origin